Krasnaya Gorbatka is an urban-type settlement and the administrative center of Selivanovsky District, Vladimir Oblast, Russia. Population:

References

Notes

Sources

Urban-type settlements in Vladimir Oblast
Sudogodsky Uyezd